James of Aragon may refer to:

James I of Aragon (1208–1276),
James II of Aragon (1267–1327)
James of Aragon (monk) (1296–1334), eldest child of King James II